The following are the winners of the 2nd annual ENnie Awards, held in 2002:

References

External links
 2002 ENnie Awards

 
ENnies winners